This is a list of Bien de Interés Cultural landmarks in the Province of Burgos, Spain.

List 
 Amaya
 Atapuerca Mountains
 Clunia
 Conjunto histórico of Briviesca
 Conjunto histórico of Burgos
 Burgos Cathedral
 Miraflores Charterhouse
 Abbey of Santa María la Real de Las Huelgas
 Conjunto histórico of Castrojeriz
 Church of Nuestra Señora del Manzano
 Conjunto histórico of Espinosa de los Monteros
 Conjunto histórico of Frías
 Conjunto histórico of Gumiel de Izán
 Conjunto histórico of Medina de Pomar
 Conjunto histórico of Miranda de Ebro
 Conjunto histórico of Oña
 Monastery of San Salvador de Oña
 Conjunto histórico of Peñaranda de Duero
 Castle of Peñaranda de Duero
 Conjunto histórico of Poza de la Sal
 Conjunto histórico of Presencio
 Church of San Andrés
 Conjunto histórico of La Puebla de Arganzón
 Conjunto histórico of Lerma
 Ducal Palace of Lerma
 Conjunto histórico of Santa Gadea del Cid
 Conjunto histórico of Santo Domingo de Silos
 Abbey of Santo Domingo de Silos
 Conjunto histórico of Treviño
 Conjunto histórico of Vadocondes
 Conjunto histórico of Villadiego
 Conjunto histórico of Villahoz
 Conjunto histórico of Villarcayo
 Monastery of San Pedro de Arlanza
 Monastery of Santa María de La Vid
 Hermitage of Santa María de Lara

References

 
Burgos